Under Western Skies is a 1945 American Western musical film directed by Jean Yarbrough and starring Martha O'Driscoll and Noah Beery, Jr. It is set in the fictional town of Rim Rock, Arizona.

Plot
Katie Wells (Martha O'Driscoll) is part of a traveling musical troupe that arrives in town after having been waylayed by local bandit King Carlos Randall (Leo Carrillo) who is smitten by the pretty entertainer. Randall and his gang follow the troupe into town and disrupt the show when Sheriff James Whitcolm Wyatt (Irving Bacon) accosts them.

Rim Rock school teacher Tod Howell (Noah Beery, Jr.) begins courting Wells, but plans are thwarted when Randall kidnaps Wells. Sheriff Wyatt rescues Wells, and she and Howell are married.

Cast
 Martha O'Driscoll as Katie Wells
 Noah Beery, Jr. as Tod Howell
 Leo Carrillo as King Carlos Randall
 Leon Errol as Willie Wells
 Irving Bacon as Sheriff James Whitcolm Wyatt
 Dorothy Granger – Maybelle Watkins
 Ian Keith as Professor Moffett
 Jennifer Holt as Charity
 Edna May Wonacott as Faith
 Earle Hodgins as Mayor Dave Mayfield
 Al Shaw as Barton Brother Act (as Shaw and Lee)
 Sam Lee as Barton Brother Act (as Shaw and Lee)
 Dorothy Granger as Maybelle
 Jack Rice as Neil Mathews

References

External links
 
 
 
 

1945 films
1940s Western (genre) musical films
American black-and-white films
American horse racing films
American Western (genre) musical films
Films set in Arizona
Universal Pictures films
1940s English-language films
Films directed by Jean Yarbrough
1940s American films